Playthings can refer to:

Playthings, a band featuring New Zealand musician and music producer Paul Kean on bass
"Playthings", an episode of the television show Supernatural
Playthings (magazine), (1903–2010) an industry magazine based in New York City focusing on toys and games
Playthings (film), a 1918 American silent film

See also
"Plaything", a song by American singer Rebbie Jackson